The Sachchiya Mata Temple is located in Osian, near Jodhpur city in the Indian state of Rajasthan.

The mother goddess Sachiya (also spelled as Sachayay Mata and Sachchiyay Mata) is worshipped by many castes and communities living in Rajasthan, Gujarat, Madhya Pradesh and North India. The temple was built by the Parmar King Upendre for his Kuldevi in the 9th to 10th century CE.

Maa Jagat Bhawani Shri Sachchiyay Mataji was historically called Shri Osiya Mataji.

An archaeological team found many samples, statues, and paintings there. Depictions included the ancient deity of Harihar (half Shiva and half Vishnu), Vasudeva with baby Krishna on his head, Krishna fighting with a horse, the killing of Putna, Kalidaman, Govardhan dharan, and butter stealing along with images of Balram which seem to represent him as the incarnation of Seshnaga.

Osiya was once a large town. At  is Lohavat, home of iron smiths. 108 Jain temples were found in Osiya.

It is connected by roads and trains with Jodhpur and Pokharan.

Legend
Goddess Sachi was a daughter of the Asura king Pauloma. The benevolent King Pauloma ruled a great kingdom, sponsoring many Brahmins (for example, Shukracharya). Vrut (Vritra) was the chief of Pauloma's army, and he wanted to marry Sachi. However, Sachi considered this proposal insulting, as she did not want to marry a servant of her father. Knowing the thoughts of Sachi, Vrut left the service of Pauloma and worshipped Lord Shiva, a common god of the Asuras. Shiva gave Vrut his blessings, and the boon that he could not be killed by any known weapons. Vrut, with his magic, assembled a great army, and with this virtue of immortality, he set out to win the Aryan lands and carve out a kingdom greater than Pauloma's.

It was the duty of Indra, the king of the gods, to defend the kingdom from Vrut. Knowing that Vrut had the blessing of immortality, Indra approached Sage Dadhichi, for Dadhichi had bones tougher than any known weapon. Dadhichi gave his bones to Indra, by performing a self-sacrifice, and Indra prepared a weapon, known as Vajra, from these bones.  (The highest award of bravery in India, the Param Vir Chakra, bears the symbol of Vajra.)  Since bones had never before been used for a weapon, this defied the condition of immortality for Vrut.

The armies met on the battlefield, but Indra proposed that instead of allowing the full forces to fight, resulting in huge carnage, he and Vrut alone should fight; the victor would take over the other's army and would marry Sachi. Indra emerged from this challenge victorious.

The foundation day of Oswals
According to Muni Sri Gyan Sunderji, the foundation day of Oswals falls on the fourteenth day of Krishna Paksha in the month of Shravan. All Jain-Oswals celebrate this with sacrifice, prayers, and meditation.

The Kuldevi of Oswals
Maa Jagat Bhawani Shri Sachchiyay Mataji also called Shri Osiya Mataji is Kuldevi of Oswals and panwar (parmar) rajputs of rajasthan

A large temple of Chamunda Mata was built in Upkeshpur, presently known as Osiya. The temple was known for Chamatkars/ miracles and attracted many worshippers.

History
A stone inscription, at the Jain temple of Osian gives a different story about the name of Sachiya Mata.  According to this story, a Jain monk, Acharya Shrimad Vijay Ratnaprabhasuriji Maharaj Sahib, visited Osian town to perform the ceremony known as Anjan Salakha, at the newly created temple of God Mahaveer, around 43 CE.  The temple of Mahavir had been built by Uhad, who was a minister of King Upaldeo; at that time, Osian was known as Upkeshpur.  A temple of Jagat Bhavani (Great Goddess) Chamunda Mata was in the town of Upkeshpur.  To receive the grace of the goddess, sacrifices of male buffaloes used to be made in the temple, during the festival of Navratri.

When the Jain monk Vijay Ratnaprabhasuriji Maharaj learned about this practice, he felt deep sympathy for the animals sacrificed. Using his influence on the minister and king, he convinced them to ban this practice. A temple in Katraj (Pune) is dedicated to Sachchiya Mata (Osiya Mata), close to the Swetamber Jain temple of Katraj. In her temple, Sachiya Mata-Ji is worshipped with lapsi (an Indian sweet dish), saffron, sandalwood, and incense.

See also
 Jodhpur
 Oswal
 Sachi

References

External links
Pictures of Sachiya Mata Temple, Osian
 Sachiya Mata Temple, Jodhpur
 Shri Sachchiyay Mataji Temple, Sardarshahar
Jain version of the story about Sachiya Mata
Jain records and references
Information on Shri Sachchiyay Mataji (Shri Osiya Mataji) Temple
shriosiyamataji.org
http://www.missionkuldevi.in/2015/07/sachchiyay-mata-temple-osiyan-rajasthan-html/
http://www.missionkuldevi.in/2016/12/sachiya-mata-katha-mahatmya-shlok-itihas-hindi/

Temples in Rajasthan
Shakti temples
Tourist attractions in Jodhpur district